Harry Read may refer to:
 Harry Read (footballer) (1885–1951), English footballer
 Harry Read (Salvationist) (1924–2021), English Commissioner in the Salvation Army
 Harry Read (sportsman) (1888–1972), Irish cricketer and rugby union player